Camarines Sur's 2nd congressional district is one of the five congressional districts of the Philippines in the province of Camarines Sur. It has been represented in the House of Representatives of the Philippines since 1919. The district consists of the west central Camarines Sur municipalities of Gainza, Libmanan, Milaor, Minalabac, Pamplona, Pasacao and San Fernando. It is currently represented in the 18th Congress by Luis Raymund Villafuerte of the National Unity Party (NUP).

Representation history

Election results

2022

2019

2016

2013

2010

See also
Legislative districts of Camarines Sur

References

Congressional districts of the Philippines
Politics of Camarines Sur
1919 establishments in the Philippines
Congressional districts of the Bicol Region
Constituencies established in 1919